Inside Out is an album by the Chick Corea Elektric Band, released in 1990 through the record label GRP. The album peaked at number six on Billboard Top Contemporary Jazz Albums chart.

Track listing

Personnel 
Musicians
 Chick Corea – acoustic piano, synthesizers, arrangements 
 Frank Gambale – guitars 
 John Patitucci – basses
 Dave Weckl – drums 
 Eric Marienthal – saxophones 
 Jay Oliver – synthesizer programming 

Production
 Chick Corea – producer, mixing 
 Dave Grusin – executive producer 
 Ron Moss – executive producer, mixing
 Larry Rosen – executive producer 
 Danny Byrnes – recording manager 
 Bernie Kirsh – recording, mixing 
 Darren Mora – second engineer 
 Robert Read – second engineer 
 Larry Mah – assistant engineer, photography 
 Mick Thompson – mixing, keyboard technician, Synclavier technician 
 Brian Alexander – piano technician 
 Doug Sax – mastering at The Mastering Lab (Hollywood, California)
 Evelyn Brechtlein – project coordinator 
 Mark Wexler – cover title 
 Barton Stabler – cover illustration 
 Mike Manoogian – cover design 
 David Gibb – graphic design 
 Jacki McCarthy – graphic design
 Andy Ruggirello – graphic design
 Dan Serrano – graphic design
 Jeffrey Mayer – photography

Chart performance

References 

1990 albums
Chick Corea albums
GRP Records albums